The Indestructible (French: L'increvable) is a 1959 French comedy film directed by Jean Boyer and starring Darry Cowl, Line Renaud and Michel Galabru.

The film's sets were designed by the art directors Robert Giordani.

Cast
 Darry Cowl as Hippolyte
 Line Renaud as Liliane Robustal
 Michel Galabru as Augustin Robustal
 René Havard as Loulou
 Patricia Karim as L'aviatrice
 Robert Rollis as L'agent d'assurances
 Lucien Raimbourg as Mr. Boudoux
 Roland Armontel as Pivois
 Francis Blanche as Francis Blanchard
 François Marié 	
 Jacques Mancier 
 Tania Miller 
 Gisèle André		
 Jack Ary

References

Bibliography 
 Goble, Alan. The Complete Index to Literary Sources in Film. Walter de Gruyter, 1999.

External links 
 

1959 films
French comedy films
1959 comedy films
1950s French-language films
Films directed by Jean Boyer
1950s French films